Drygalski Glacier may refer to:

Drygalski Glacier (Antarctica)
Drygalski Glacier (Tanzania) on Mount Kilimanjaro